Guest is a 2020 British psychological horror short film directed and written by Finn Callan. It stars Melania Crisan as a disturbed young woman who wakes up in a stranger's house with several injuries after encountering a creature called The Guest. The film also stars Jessica Munna and Anna Fraser. The film premiered on 27 August 2020 at FrightFest and, on 24 December 2020, was uploaded to YouTube.

Upon release, the film received very positive reviews from critics, praising the film's direction, cinematography, monster design and special effects. A sequel is currently in development.

Plot 
Mary, a frightened young woman, wakes up in the bedroom of a stranger's house with injuries that have left her partially blind and deaf. The homeowner (The Woman), who bandaged her up after discovering her in the bathroom that morning, manages to slightly restore her hearing by inserting a hearing aid device into her ear and asks her what happened.

In a flashback sequence, Mary remembers the previous night where she was chased through the countryside by a tall, slender humanoid creature with no eyelids called The Guest. During the chase, Mary finds The Woman's house and breaks inside to escape from The Guest. Finding the house empty, Mary quickly arms herself with a knife from the kitchen and hides in the bathroom, only to discover that The Guest is waiting for her inside. Seemingly driven mad by The Guest's presence, Mary pours a bottle of bleach over her eyes to blind herself. Upon hearing The Guest's rattling breathing however, Mary grabs the knife and plunges it into her ears, causing herself to go partially deaf as she was at the start of the film.

Frightened at Mary's explanation of the previous night, The Woman quickly leaves the room and locks the door, trapping Mary inside. Mary then pulls back her bandages to see that The Guest sitting on the bed next to her. Mary reclines in the bed and braces herself for it to attack her. Instead, The Guest turns away from her and looks at the floor with a sad expression on its face, much to Mary's surprise and confusion. The film then abruptly ends.

Cast 
 Melania Crisan as Mary
 Jessica Munna as The Woman
 Anna Fraser as The Guest

Production

Monster design
Finn Callan looked to various pre-existing works for inspiration for The Guest's design and which he brought together like a "jigsaw" and had the film's prosthetics artist Francesca Giacovelli illustrate. He cited films such as The Draggs from Fantastic Planet, the Fishermen from Balance and Christiane from Eyes Without a Face as the key inspirational points during the process.

Special effects
Deciding early on that the special effects to create The Guest would be all practical, Callan enlisted the help of Francesca to create the elaborate special effects make up which took 6 hours to apply to Anna Fraser who played The Guest, who Callan said compared the process to "being buried alive".

Release and reception 
The short film was first shown on at FrightFest on 27 August 2020 and then went around the American horror film festival circuit, premiering in North America at Screamfest on 8 October. During its festival run, it received acclaim from various horror publications, praising the film's direction, cinematography, special effects and monster design.

On 24 December 2020, Callan uploaded the short to YouTube with a suicide prevention disclaimer placed before the film. The short film quickly became popular and, as of November 2022, has received over 8 million views on the site. Several notable YouTubers have reacted to Guest on YouTube since its upload, including CoryxKenshin and Jacksepticeye.

Festival selections 
 2020 - FrightFest (World Premiere)
 2020 - Screamfest Horror Film Festival
 2020 - Telluride Horror Show
 2020 - Knoxville Horror Film Festival
 2020 - New York City Horror Film Festival
 2020 - IFI HorrorThon
 2020 - 6ix Screams International Horror Film Festival
 2020 - HorrorFest International
 2020 - HorrOrigins Film Festival

Sequel

Callan is currently developing a sequel to Guest, which will be financed by Chilling, a horror relaxation app. Anna Fraser will return as The Guest in the sequel, with Simon Bigg also being cast. The sequel to Guest will be around twice the length of its predecessor.

References

External links
 
 

2020 films
2020 horror films
2020 short films
British horror short films
British psychological horror films
2020s English-language films
2020s psychological horror films
2020s British films